Kanbalu District is a district in Sagaing Division of Burma (Myanmar). Its administrative center is the city of Kanbalu.

Townships

The district consists of the following townships, all formerly from Shwebo District:

 Kanbalu Township
 Kyunhla Township

Notes

Districts of Myanmar
Sagaing Region